Angela Oakley (née Goodall) (born 29 August 1961 in Glasgow) is a British former archer.

Archery

Goodall competed at the 1982 World Field Archery Championships and European Field Championships winning a silver medal in both events.

She took part in the 1982 Commonwealth Games and finished 17th.

In 1984 she won gold at the European Field Championships and silver at the World Field Archery Championships. At the Olympics she came thirtieth.

References

External links 
 Profile on worldarchery.org

1961 births
Living people
British female archers
Olympic archers of Great Britain
Archers at the 1982 Commonwealth Games
Archers at the 1984 Summer Olympics
Sportspeople from Glasgow
Commonwealth Games competitors for Northern Ireland
20th-century British women